Phalonidia holguina is a species of moth of the family Tortricidae. It is found on Cuba.

The wingspan is about 7 mm. The ground colour of the forewings is whitish with brownish suffusions. The hindwings are whitish basally and mixed with brownish otherwise.

Etymology
The species name refers to Holguín, the type locality.

References

Moths described in 2007
Phalonidia
Endemic fauna of Cuba